KTF a may refer to:
KTF, or Korea Telecom Freetel
Kokoda Track Foundation
 Takaka Aerodrome IATA code